Maybelle Stamper (1907–1995) was an American printmaker.

Stamper studied at the School of the Museum of Fine Arts in Boston and the Art Students League of New York. In 1947 she moved to Captiva Island, Florida, where she became a friend of her neighbor Robert Rauschenberg. Around 1990, she deeded her property to Rauschenburg in exchange for being able to live there and for financial support until her death.

Her work is included in the permanent collections of the Block Museum of Art, the Cincinnati Art Museum, the Smithsonian American Art Museum, and the Currier Museum of Art.

References

1907 births
1995 deaths
20th-century American women artists
American women printmakers
Artists from New Hampshire
Artists in the Smithsonian American Art Museum collection
20th-century American printmakers
People from Dublin, New Hampshire
Artists from Florida
People from Lee County, Florida
School of the Museum of Fine Arts at Tufts alumni
Art Students League of New York alumni